The United States men's national volleyball team represents the country in international competitions and friendly matches. The team is governed by USA Volleyball.
The team has won five Olympic medals, including three gold.

History

As the birthplace of volleyball, the United States founded the first association to regulate the sport. The United States Volleyball Association was formed in 1927, and was the founding member of FIVB in 1947.
However, by the time of volleyball's international growth in the 1940s, the US was no longer a major power. They competed in the inaugural volleyball Olympic tournament in 1964. The US returned to the elite in the 1980s, winning the FIVB World Championship in 1986 in Paris, as well as four golds at the Pan American Games and eight at the NORCECA Championships. Of the nine times that the US have competed at the World Cup, they have finished fourth five times, most recently in 2007. They won the event in 1985, and last time out in 2011 they finished in sixth place, eight points away from the medal positions.
The team was a bronze medal at the World Championships in 1994. Four years prior, in Italy, they finished sixth. Of the 14 times the United States have qualified for this competition, they have finished in the top 10 on eight occasions.
The US at the World Cup in 1985 and the World Championship in 1986. The US team won its first Olympic gold medal in 20 years when they defeated Brazil 3-1 to take gold at Beijing 2008. The team failed to defend their title in 2012, losing 3-0 to Italy in the quarterfinals for an equal-fifth finish. The US won the 2015 World Cup title, where they got the first Rio 2016 Olympic qualification ticket. In September 2015 U.S. national team took part in 2015 World Cup. American players won 10 of 11 matches (the same result as Poland and Italy) and lost only to Poland (1-3). On September 23, 2015 they played their last game at the World Cup and defeated Argentina (3–1). The  US won the World Cup on a points tie-breaker and qualified for the 2016 Summer Olympics. It was their second victory in World Cup tournament (previous in 1985).
In the 2018 FIVB Volleyball Men's Nations League, the inaugural edition replacing the World League, the U.S. national team defeated the reigning Olympic champions and 9-time World League winners Brazil in straight sets for the bronze medal.

Tournament record

Olympics

 1964 Tokyo — 9th place
 Bright, Brown, Erickson, Murray, Hill, Griebenow, Hammer, Highland, Lantg, Nelson, O'Hara, Ernie Suwara, Taylor and Velasco. Head Coach: Wilson.
 1968 Mexico — 7th place
 Alstrom, Bright, Davenport, Duke, Haine, Henn, May, Patterson, Rundle, Stanley, Suwara and Velasco. Head Coach: Coleman.
 1984 Los Angeles —  Gold medal
 Berzins, Buck, Duwelius, Dvorak, Kiraly, Marlowe, Powers, Salmons, Saunders, Sunderland, Timmons and Waldie. Head Coach: Beal.
 1988 Seoul —  Gold medal
 Buck, Ctvrtlik, Fortune, Kiraly, Luyties, Partie, Root, Sato, Saunders, Stork, Tanner and Timmons. Head Coach: Dunphy.
 1992 Barcelona —  Bronze medal
 Becker, Briceno, Ctvrtlik, Fortune, Greenbaum, Hilliard, Ivie, Partie, Samuelson, Sato, Stork and Timmons. Head Coach: Sturm.
 1996 Atlanta — 9th place
 Ball, Ctvrtlik, Fortune, Hyden, Ivie, Lambert, Landry, Nygaard, Sorensen, Stork, Watts and Winslow. Head Coach: Sturm.
 2000 Sydney — 11th place
 Ball, Barnett, Hoff, Hyden, Lambert, Landry, McCaw, Millar, Nygaard, Roumain, Sullivan and Witt. Head Coach: Beal.
 2004 Athens — 4th place
 Ball, Barnett, Billings, Eatherton, Gardner, Hoff, Millar, Priddy, Salmon, Stanley, Sullivan and Suxho. Head Coach: Beal.
 2008 Beijing —  Gold medal
 Ball, Gardner, Hansen, Hoff, Lambourne, Lee, Millar, Priddy, Rooney, Salmon, Stanley and Touzinsky. Head Coach: McCutcheon
 2012 London — 5th place
 Anderson, Holmes, Lambourne, Lee, Lotman, McKienzie, Priddy, Rooney, Smith, Stanley, Suxho and Thornton. Head Coach: Knipe
 2016 Rio de Janeiro —  Bronze medal
 Anderson, Russell, Sander, Lee, K. Shoji, Priddy, Troy, Jaeschke, Christenson, Holt, Smith and E. Shoji. Head Coach: Speraw
 2020 Tokyo — 10th place
 Anderson, Sander, Ensing, Stahl, K. Shoji, Defalco, Christenson, Holt, Jaeschke, Muagututia, Smith, E. Shoji. Head Coach: Speraw

FIVB World Championship

 1956 France — 6th place
 1960 Brazil — 7th place
 1966 Czechoslovakia — 11th place
 1970 Bulgaria — 18th place
 1974 Mexico — 14th place
 1978 Italy — 19th place
 1982 Argentina — 13th place
 1986 France —  Gold medal
 Dvorak, Saunders, Salmons, Ctvrtlik, Partie, Timmons, Buck, Stork, Sato, Powers, Kiraly. Head Coach: Dunphy.
 1990 Brazil — 13th place
 1994 Greece —  Bronze medal
 1998 Japan — 9th place
 2002 Argentina — 9th place
 Ball, Seiffert, McKienzie, Sullivan, Bunker, Priddy, Millar, Salmon, Billings, Stanley, Polster, Naeve. Head coach: Beal
 2006 Japan — 10th place
 Polster, Lambourne, Eatherton, Suxho, Priddy, Millar, Salmon, Hoff, Stanley, Gardner, McKienzie, Taliaferro. Head coach: McCutcheon
 2010 Italy — 6th place
 Anderson, Rooney, Lee, Lambourne, Lotman, Winder, Priddy, Stanley, Hansen, Holmes, Clark, Holt. Head coach: Knipe
 2014 Poland — 7th place
 Anderson, Sander, Lee, Lotman, K. Shoji, Ciarelli, Christenson, Clark, Holt, Reft, Smith, E. Shoji. Head coach: Speraw
 2018 Italy/Bulgaria –  Bronze medal
 Anderson, Russell, Sander, Jendryk, Mcdonnell, K. Shoji, Patch, Christenson, Langlois, Holt, Averill, Smith, Watten, E. Shoji. Head coach: Speraw
 2022 Poland/Slovenia — 6th place
 Anderson, Russell, Jendryk, Ensing, DeFalco, Christenson, K. Russell, Tuaniga, Muagututia, Averill, Smith, Briggs, Shoji, Kessel. Head coach: Speraw

FIVB World Cup

 1977 — 10th place
 1985 —  Gold medal
 1989 — 4th place
 1991 —  Bronze medal
 1995 — 4th place
 1999 — 4th place
 2003 — 4th place
 Ball, Sullivan, Suxho, Priddy, Millar, Salmon, Billings, Hoff, Stanley, Gardner, Polster, Naeve. Head coach: Beal
 2007 — 4th place
 Ball, Rooney, Polster, Lee, Lambourne, Priddy, Millar, Salmon, Hoff, Stanley, Hansen, Gardner. Head coach: McCutcheon
 2011 — 6th place
 Anderson, Rooney, Patak, Lee, Lotman, Priddy, Salmon, Holmes, Hansen, Thornton, Holt. Head coach: Knipe
 2015 —  Gold medal
 Anderson, Russell, Sander, Lee, Lotman, K. Shoji, Troy, Christenson, Holmes, Jablonsky, Holt, Smith, Watten, E. Shoji. Head Coach: Speraw
 2019 —  Bronze medal
 Anderson, Russell, Jendryk, Stahl, Defalco, Saeta, Christenson, Holt, Patch, Maʻa, Tuaniga, Muagututia, Smith, E. Shoji. Head Coach: Speraw

FIVB World Grand Champions Cup

 1993 Japan — 5th place
 2005 Japan —  Silver medal
 Eatherton, Polster, Lambourne, Hoff, McKienzie, Millar, Priddy, Salmon, Stanley, Suxho, Tamas, Olree. Head Coach: McCutcheon
 2013 Japan — 5th place
 Anderson, Rooney, Lee, K. Shoji, Priddy, Troy, Christenson, Tavana, Menzel, Clark, Holt, E. Shoji. Head coach: Speraw
 2017 Japan — 4th place
 Anderson, Russell, Sander, Jendryk, K. Shoji, Jaeschke, Christenson, Patch, Clark, Holt, Averill, Smith, Watten, E. Shoji. Head coach: Speraw

FIVB Volleyball World League

 1990 Osaka — 7th place
 1991 Milan — 6th place
 1992 Genoa —  Bronze medal
 1993 São Paulo — 9th place
 1994 Milan — 12th place
 1995 Rio de Janeiro — 10th place
 2000 Rotterdam — 6th place
 2001 Katowice — 9th place
 2006 Moscow — T-10th place
 2007 Katowice —  Bronze medal
 Polster, Taliaferro, Lambourne, Lee, Priddy, Millar, Salmon, Hoff, Stanley, Hansen, Gardner. Head Coach: McCutcheon.
 2008 Rio de Janeiro —  Gold medal
 Ball, Rooney, Lambourne, Priddy, Millar, Salmon, Hoff, Stanley, Hansen, Gardner, Lee, Touzinsky. Head Coach: McCutcheon.
 2009 Belgrade — 6th place
 Rooney, Patak, Lee, Lambourne, Lotman, Suxho, Hein, Smith, Hoff, Stanley, Hansen, Jablonsky, Touzinsky, Reft. Head Coach: Knipe.
 2010 Córdoba — 8th place
 Anderson, Rooney, Patak, Lee, Lotman, Priddy, Hildebrand, Stanley, Hansen, Holmes, Holt, Reft. Head Coach: Knipe.
 2011 Gdańsk — 7th place
 Anderson, Rooney, Patak, Lee, Lambourne, Lotman, Thornton, Holmes, Stanley, Hansen, Holt, Touzinsky. Head Coach: Knipe.
 2012 Sofia —  Silver medal
 Anderson, Rooney, Lee, Lambourne, Lotman, Suxho, Priddy, Thornton, Holmes, Stanley, Smith, McKienzie. Head Coach: Knipe.
 2013 Mar del Plata — 12th place
 Anderson, Lee, Lambourne, Lotman, K. Shoji, Caldwell, Troy, Clark, Jablonsky, Holt, Smith, E. Shoji. Head Coach: Speraw.
 2014 Florence —  Gold medal
 Anderson, Rooney, Sander, Lee, Lotman, K. Shoji, Christenson, Holmes, Clark, Holt, Muagututia, E. Shoji. Head Coach: Speraw.
 2015 Rio de Janeiro —  Bronze medal
 Anderson, Russell, Sander, Lee, Lotman, K. Shoji, Priddy, Troy, Jaeschke, Christenson, Holmes, Holt, Smith, Watten, E. Shoji. Head Coach: Speraw.
 2016 Kraków — 5th place
 Anderson, Russell, Sander, Lee, K. Shoji , Priddy, Troy, Jaeschke, Christenson, Holt, Smith, E. Shoji. Head Coach: Speraw.
 2017 Curitiba — 4th place
 Sander, Jendryk, K. Shoji, Jaeschke, Christenson, Mcdonnell, Patch, Clark, Defalco, Muagututia, Averill, Smith, Watten, E. Shoji. Head Coach: Speraw.

FIVB Volleyball Nations League

 2018 —  Bronze medal
 Anderson, Russell, Sander, Jendryk, Shaw, Stahl, K. Shoji, Defalco, McDonnell, Christenson, Holt, Patch, Sander, Jaeschke, Langlois, Averill, Smith, Watten, E. Shoji, Seif, Ensing. Head coach: Speraw
 2019 —  Silver medal
 Anderson, Russell, Sander, Jendryk, Shaw, Stahl, K. Shoji, Defalco, McDonnell, Christenson, Holt, Patch, Sander, Jaeschke, Langlois, Averill, Smith, Watten, E. Shoji, Muagututia, Ensing. Head coach: Speraw

 2021 — 7th place
 Anderson, Sander, Jendryk, Ensing, Stahl, K. Shoji, Defalco, Hanes, Christenson, Holt, Patch, Sander, Tuaniga, Jaeschke, Muagututia, Averill, Smith, Watten, E. Shoji. Head coach: Speraw
 2022 —  Silver medal
 Smith, Jendryk, Ensing, Stahl, Defalco, A. Russell, Christenson, K. Russell, Dagostino, Kessel, Tuaniga, Mitchem, Muagututia, Shoji. Head coach: Speraw

NORCECA Championship

 1969 —  Bronze medal
 1971 —  Silver medal
 1973 —  Gold medal
 1975 —  Bronze medal
 1977 — 5th place
 1979 — 5th place
 1981 —  Silver medal
 1983 —  Gold medal
 1985 —  Gold medal
 1987 —  Silver medal
 1989 —  Bronze medal
 1991 —  Silver medal
 1993 —  Silver medal
 1995 —  Silver medal
 1997 —  Silver medal
 1999 —  Gold medal
 2001 —  Silver medal
 2003 —  Gold medal
 2005 —  Gold medal
 Olree, Polster, Tamas, Lambourne, Eatherton, Suxho, Millar, Salmon, Billings, Hoff, Stanley, McKienzie. Head Coach: McCutcheon
 2007 —  Gold medal
 Ball, Polster, Lambourne, Lee, Hoff, Millar, Priddy, Salmon, Stanley, Hansen, Gardner, Touzinsky. Head Coach: McCutcheon
 2009 —  Silver medal
 Anderson, Rooney, Patak, Lee, Lambourne, Lotman, Millar, Stanley, Hansen, Thorton, Jablonsky, Holt. Head coach: Knipe
 2011 —  Silver medal
 Anderson, Rooney, Patak, Lee, Lambourne, Lotman, Millar, Stanley, Hansen, Thorton, Jablonsky, Holt. Head coach: Knipe
 2013 —  Gold medal
 Anderson, Rooney, Caldwell, Lee, Priddy, Troy, Christenson, Menzel, Clark, Holt, Tavana, E. Shoji. Head coach: Speraw
 2015 — Did not participate
 2017 —  Gold medal
 Anderson, Russell, Sander, Stahl, K. Shoji, Jaeschke, Christenson, McDonnell, Patch, Clark, Holt, Smith, Watten, E. Shoji. Head coach: Speraw
 2019 —  Silver medal
 Jendryk, Ensing, Stahl, Defalco, J. Worsley, Carmody, Maʻa, B. Sander, Kessel, Wieczorek, Huhmann, G. Worsley, Dagostino, K. Russell. Head Coach: Hawks

Pan American Cup

 2006 —  Gold medal
 2008 —  Gold medal
 Anderson, Patak, Tarr, Proper, Meerstein, Jablonsky, Winder, Hildebrand, Hein, Scheftic, Lotman, Reft. Head coach: Knipe
 2009 —  Gold medal
 Vance, Bittner, McKinney, Kneubuhl, Hildebrand, Tarr, Meerstein, Nielsen, Thornton, Holt, Zahn, Watten. Head coach: McLaughlin
 2010 —  Gold medal
 Watten, Tarr, McKinney, Thornton, Bittner, Lipsitz, Smith, Hildebrand, Clark, Brunner, Jablonsky, McGuire. Head coach: McLaughlin
 2011 —  Silver medal
 Menzel, Muagututia, Troy, Winder, Hein, Meehan, Shoji, Smith, Tarr, Price, Jablonsky, Watten. Head coach: Mayforth
 2012 —  Gold medal
 Davis, Rawson, Clark, Muagututia, Troy, DuFault, McDonnell, Ciarelli, Ammerman, Watten, Sander, Shoji. Head coach: Patchell
 2013 — 5th place
 Olbright, Taylor, Owens, Sunder, Brinkley, McDonnell, Price, Ammerman, Sangrey, Ratajczak, Lavaja, Sander. Head coach: Patchell
 2014 —  Silver medal
 Rowe, Crabb, Mcllvaine, Brinkley, Kevorken, Page, Averill, Dejno, La Cavera, Nally, Boldog, Olson. Head coach: Sullivan
 2015 — 6th place
 Kessel, Jendryk, Benesh, Brinkley, Langlois, Mcllvaine, Nally 
 2016 — 5th place
Langlois, Petty, Sander, Taylor, Tuaniga, Hutz, Johnson, Clark, Jendryk, Averill, DeFalco, Brinkley. Head coach: Larsen
 2017 — 5th place
Jarman, Stahl, Jendryk, Greene, Sander, Langlois, Arnitz, Ensing, Seif, Wieczorek, Stadick, Saeta, Tuileta, Enriques. Head coach: Neilson
 2018 — 7th place
 2019 — 5th place
 2021 —  Bronze medal
Holdaway, Kauling, Gillis, Pasteur, Mitchem, Lietzke, Sani, McHenry, Champlin, Wetter, Sloane, McCauley, Palma, Dagostino. Head coach: Read
 2022 —  Bronze medal
Jenness, Shaw, Pasteur, Hanes, Sani, Gasman, Isaacson, Omene, Ezeonu, Worsley, Briggs, McCauley, Wildman, McHenry. Head coach: Read

Volleyball America's Cup

 1998 — 14th place
 1999 —  Silver medal
 2000 —  Bronze medal
 2001 — 4th place
 2005 —  Gold medal
 Lee, Robinson, Polster, Lambourne, Eatherton, Suxho, Seiffert, Salmon, Olree, Hoff, Toppel, McKienzie. Head coach: McCutcheon.
 2007 —  Gold medal
 Ball, Billings, Eatherton, Hansen, Hoff, Lambourne, Millar, Polster, Priddy, Rooney, Salmon, Stanley. Head Coach: McCutcheon.
 2008 —  5th place
 Anderson, Nielson, Eatherton, Lambourne, Jablonsky, Winder, Billings, Hein, Taliaferro, Thomas, Touzinsky. Head Coach: Larsen.

Goodwill Games
 1986 —  Silver medal
Ctvrtlik, Dvorak, Kiraly, Luyties, Miller, Partie, Powers, Salmons, Saunders, Tanner, Stork, Timmons.
 1990 — 4th place

Team

2022 World Championship
The following is the American roster in the 2022 World Championship.

Head coach:  John Speraw

2020 Tokyo Olympics

Kit providers
The table below shows the history of kit providers for the United States national volleyball team.

Sponsorship
Primary sponsors include: main sponsors like Liberty Mutual, Mizuno Corporation and Commerce Bancorp, other sponsors: Molten Corporation, Almond Breeze, Arirweave, National Car, CoSport, Oppiaperformance, Alamo and Muscleaidtape.

See also
 United States women's national volleyball team
 United States national beach volleyball team

References

External links
Official website
FIVB profile

United States
Men